The eighteenth season of Family Guy was announced on February 12, 2019. It aired on Fox from September 29, 2019, to May 17, 2020.

The series follows the dysfunctional Griffin family, consisting of father Peter, mother Lois, daughter Meg, son Chris, baby Stewie, and the family dog Brian, who reside in their hometown of Quahog. The season included a crossover with Beavis and Butt-Head guest starring Mike Judge reprising his roles as Beavis and Butt-Head.

In April 2020, the show joined the rest of Fox's Animation Domination lineup in a partnership with Caffeine for the AniDom Beyond Show, a recap show hosted by Andy Richter. The hour-long program featured interviews with guests and live interactivity with fans online, with recaps for the episodes that aired through April and May. The Family Guy episode aired on May 10, 2020, featuring Richard Appel, Seth Green, and Michael K Hunt. On May 18, 2020, John Viener joined the show with other writers from the Fox Animation Domination lineup.

Due to the debuts of freshman animated sitcoms Bless the Harts and Duncanville taking the 8:30pm time slot, which bumped Bob's Burgers to 9 pm, the show moved to 9:30 pm.

The season's executive producers were Seth MacFarlane, Alec Sulkin, Richard Appel, Steve Callaghan, Danny Smith, Kara Vallow, Mark Hentemann, Tom Devanney, Patrick Meighan and Cherry Chevapravatdumrong. The season's showrunners were Sulkin and Appel.

The season aired in the UK from October 14, 2019, to June 1, 2020, on ITV2.


20th Anniversary 
In February 2019, Fox released a trailer for Season 18, both acting as a teaser for the upcoming episodes, but also as a way of celebrating 20 years of the series. On April 15, 2019, TBS aired twenty episodes of the series, handpicked by Seth MacFarlane. A DVD compilation set containing 20 episodes, titled Family Guy's 20 Greatest Hits, was released on January 8, 2019.

Episodes

References

2019 American television seasons
2020 American television seasons
Family Guy seasons
Family Guy (season 18) episodes